The Midshipmaid is a 1932 British comedy film directed by Albert de Courville and starring Jessie Matthews, Frederick Kerr, Basil Sydney and Nigel Bruce. The film is based on the 1931 play of the same title by Ian Hay and Stephen King-Hall. it was released in the U.S. as Midshipmaid Gob. John Mills makes his film debut in a supporting role. It was shot at the Lime Grove Studios, with sets designed by the art director Alfred Junge.

Plot
In this comedy with musical interludes, pompous economy expert Sir Percy Newbiggin (Fred Kerr) visits the Naval Fleet in Malta to see what cuts can be made in their expenditure. The officers all fall over themselves to woo his beautiful daughter Celia (Jessie Matthews), who accompanies him: she becomes engaged to the son of the First Sea Lord and her father decides to leave economics to the Navy.

Cast
Jessie Matthews as  Celia Newbiggin
Frederick Kerr as Sir Percy Newbiggin
Basil Sydney as Commander Fosberry
Nigel Bruce as Major Spink
A. W. Baskcomb as AB Pook
Claud Allister as Chinley
Anthony Bushell as Lieutenant Valentine
Edwin Lawrence as Tappett
Archie Glen as Bunduy
Albert Rebla as Robbins
John Mills as Golightly
Anthony Holles as Lieutenant Kingsford
George Zucco as Lord Dore
Joyce Kirby as Dora
Steve Condos as Horse
Nick Condos as Horse
Hay Plumb as Sailor
John Turnbull as Officer
Wilma Vanne as Cora

References

External links

1932 films
1932 comedy films
British comedy films
Films based on works by Ian Hay
Films directed by Albert de Courville
Military humor in film
British films based on plays
Seafaring films
Films set in England
Films set in Malta
Gainsborough Pictures films
Films scored by Jack Beaver
Films shot at Lime Grove Studios
British black-and-white films
1930s English-language films
1930s British films